Saint-Sozy is a commune in the Lot department in south-western France.

The town is known for its production of foie gras (Clos Saint Sozy), nuts, and tobacco.

Its stadium is named after René Lespinasse, former manager of the local football club "Les Coucous de Saint-Sozy".

See also
Communes of the Lot department

References

External links

 Saint-Sozy official website

Saintsozy